The Wind Cannot Read is a 1958 British drama film directed by Ralph Thomas and starring Dirk Bogarde, Yoko Tani, Ronald Lewis and John Fraser. It was based on the 1946 novel by Richard Mason, who also wrote the screenplay.

Songwriter Peter Hart received the 1958 Ivor Novello award for Best Song Musically and Lyrically for the title song, performed by Vera Lynn.

The title derives from a Japanese poem, and lines from the poem are prominently displayed (in English) in the movie. The same lines are on the tombstone of novelist/screenwriter Mason, who died in 1997.

Plot
The film takes place in Burma and India during World War II.

A British officer falls in love with his Japanese instructor at a military language school. They start a romance, but she is regarded as the enemy and is not accepted by his countrymen. They marry in secret and plan on spending his two weeks' leave together. When one of the other officers is injured, he is sent into the field as an interrogator. Later he is captured by the Japanese army when he is patrolling with a brigadier and an Indian driver in a Japanese-controlled zone. He escapes and returns to his own lines, only to discover that his wife is suffering from a brain tumour. Although the doctor initially gives her good odds of surviving, she dies after an operation.

Cast
 Dirk Bogarde as Flight Lieutenant Michael Quinn
 Yoko Tani as Aiko Suzuki ('Sabbi')
 Ronald Lewis as Fenwick
 John Fraser as Peter Munroe
 Anthony Bushell as Brigadier
 Heihachirō Ōkawa as Lieutenant Nakamura (Japanese: 陸軍中尉中村, Rikugun-Chūi Nakamura)
 Marne Maitland as Bahadur
 Michael Medwin as Officer Lamb
 Richard Leech as Hobson
 Tony Wager as Moss
 Tadashi Ikeda as Itsumi-san
 Yôichi Matsue as Corporal Mori (Japanese: 毛利伍長, Mōri Gochō)
 Donald Pleasence as Doctor
 Joy Michael as First nurse
 Avice Landone as Second nurse
 Jasdev Singh Soin as Indian soldier

Production
In 1955 David Lean agreed to film Richard Mason's novel The Wind Cannot Read, the story of a romance between a British officer and a self-exiled Japanese woman in India circa 1943, during World War II.

Originally Lean considered making the lead character a Canadian and offered the part to Glenn Ford. Lean also offered the role to Kenneth More, who was unsure about whether the public would accept him in the part and turned it down. It was a decision More later regarded as "the greatest mistake I ever made professionally". Lean had completed a script in collaboration with Mason and cast Keiko Kishi as the girl, but disagreed with Alexander Korda, who was to have produced the film and the project fell through.

Lean had already entered into discussions with Sam Spiegel, regarding a film version of Pierre Boulle's novel The Bridge on the River Kwai. After Korda's death in 1956, the rights to Mason's novel were sold to Rank Film Productions, who assigned the project to the team of Betty Box and Ralph Thomas.

Filming took place on location in India in early 1958, with Dirk Bogarde in the main role.

Ralph Thomas later said he thought Sir John Davis of Rank "very bravely" authorised location-filming in India "because he trusted David Lean's judgement that it was a splendid book. It was a real three-handkerchief picture, which I thoroughly enjoyed making, and Dirk was very good in it."

Reception
The film was one of the most popular at the British box office in 1958. Kinematograph Weekly listed it as being "in the money" at the British box office in 1958.

References

External links

1958 films
1958 romantic drama films
1950s war drama films
1950s English-language films
British war drama films
British romantic drama films
Films shot at Pinewood Studios
Burma Campaign films
Films based on British novels
Films directed by Ralph Thomas
Films scored by Angelo Francesco Lavagnino
1950s British films